The Messines Ridge (New Zealand) Memorial is a World War I memorial, located in Messines Ridge British Cemetery, near the town of Mesen, Belgium. The memorial lists 827 officers and men of the New Zealand Expeditionary Force with no known grave who died in or near Messines in 1917 and 1918. This period included the Battle of Messines.

History
The memorial, designed by the English architect Charles Holden, is one of seven such memorials on the Western Front to the missing dead from New Zealand. The others are located at Buttes New British Cemetery, Caterpillar Valley Cemetery, Grevillers, Tyne Cot, Cite Bonjean, and Marfaux.

The land on which the cemetery and memorial were constructed had been the site of a mill (the Moulin d'Hospice) belonging to the Institute Royal de Messines (a Belgian orphanage and school, itself formerly a Benedictine abbey). The mill dated from 1445, but was destroyed during the war, with the memorial erected where the mill once stood.

Other memorials in the Mesen area to the forces of New Zealand include a white stone obelisk a short distance to the south. This obelisk, one of several National Memorials erected by New Zealand, was unveiled by King Albert I of Belgium on 1 August 1924. This obelisk is now part of the New Zealand Memorial Park. Annual remembrance services take place at the memorials in and around Mesen on Anzac Day.

Footnotes and references

Further reading
 From the Uttermost Ends: A Guide to Sites of New Zealand Interest on the Western Front in Belgium and France (Ian McGibbon, OUP Australia and New Zealand, Dec 2001)
 'Het New Zealand Memorial to the Missing in Mesen', P. Colson, in: Mesen. Kleine Stad op de Heuvel, Mesen, 1995, pp. 83–89.

External links
 Commonwealth War Graves Commission details of the Memorial
 
 Messines Ridge (New Zealand) Memorial (Belgian heritage register)
 Catalogue entry for the Memorial register (National Library of Australia)
 Photograph of the memorial (CWGC)

Commonwealth War Graves Commission memorials
World War I memorials in Belgium
World War I cemeteries in Belgium
New Zealand military memorials and cemeteries
Charles Holden buildings